This is the results breakdown of the local elections held in the Valencian Community on 13 June 1999. The following tables show detailed results in the autonomous community's most populous municipalities, sorted alphabetically.

Overall

City control
The following table lists party control in the most populous municipalities, including provincial capitals (shown in bold). Gains for a party are displayed with the cell's background shaded in that party's colour.

Municipalities

Alcoy
Population: 60,476

Alicante
Population: 272,432

Benidorm
Population: 50,946

Castellón de la Plana
Population: 137,741

Elche
Population: 191,713

Elda
Population: 52,490

Gandia
Population: 57,518

Orihuela
Population: 50,581

Paterna
Population: 46,380

Sagunto
Population: 56,607

Torrent
Population: 62,562

Torrevieja
Population: 38,336

Valencia

Population: 739,412

See also
1999 Valencian regional election

References

Valencian Community
1999